A t-shaped uterus is a type of uterine malformation wherein the uterus is shaped resembling the letter T. This is typically observed in DES-exposed women. It is recognised in the ESHRE/ESGE classification, and is associated with failed implantation, increased risk of ectopic pregnancy, miscarriage and preterm delivery. There is a surgical procedure to correct the malformation.

Causes
The T-shaped malformation is commonly associated with in-utero exposure to diethylstilbestrol (the so-called "DES daughters").  It is also presented congenitally.

Diagnosis
Women are often diagnosed with this condition after several failed pregnancies, proceeded by exploratory diagnostic procedures, such as magnetic resonance, sonography, and particularly hysterosalpingography. In such studies, a widening of the interstitial and isthmus of uterine tube is observed, as well as constrictions or narrowing of the uterus as a whole, especially the lower and lateral portions, hence the "t" denomination. The uterus might be simultaneously reduced in volume, and other abnormalities might be concomitantly present.

Prognosis
Although fertility is impaired, T-shaped uterus sufferers can bear children.  However, they carry a greater risk of complications, such as miscarriages, reduced fertility and preterm births, both before and after any treatment.

The current surgical procedure to treat this malformation, termed a hysteroscopic correction or metroplasty, is undertaken by performing a lateral incision of the uterine walls, and can return the organ to a normal morphology, while improving the patient's former reproductive performance. It is considered a low-risk procedure, and can also improve term delivery rate by up to 10-fold, as long as the endometrium is considered to be in good condition. However, risks after the procedure include placenta accreta, Asherman's syndrome and severe haemorrhage.

See also
 Vaginal adenosis

References

Further reading
 
 
 KALTFMANL, RAYMOND H., MD ERVIN ADAM, and Gary L. Binder. "Upper genital tract changes and pregnancy outcome in offspring exposed in utero to diethylstilbestrol." (1980).
 

Mammal reproductive system
Anatomical pathology
Congenital disorders of female genital organs